The Fall of the Rebel Angels (Italian: La caduta degli angeli ribelli) is a 1981 Italian drama film written and directed by Marco Tullio Giordana. For her performance Alida Valli won the  David di Donatello for best supporting actress.

Plot    
Cecilia, a young bourgeois, despite her comfortable life, leaves work, family and loved ones to follow a man whom she met by chance and who will later discover to be a terrorist isolated from his companions. But this life in constant flight is not for her, she will decide to end it with a dramatic choice.

Cast 
Vittorio Mezzogiorno as Vittorio
Clio Goldsmith as  Cecilia
Yves Beneyton as Giovanni
Alida Valli as  Bettina
Francesca Rinaldi as Viola

See also   
 List of Italian films of 1981

References

External links

1981 films
Italian drama films
1981 drama films
Films directed by Marco Tullio Giordana 
1980s Italian-language films
1980s Italian films